Li Tong (born 8 October 1988) is a Chinese slalom canoeist who has competed at the international level since 2006.

She won a gold medal in the K1 event at the 2014 Asian Games in Incheon, and a silver in the same event in 2018 near Jakarta. Tong finished in 5th place in the K1 team event at the 2018 World Championships in Rio. She earned her best senior world championship result, of 12th, at the 2015 World Championships in Lee Valley.

Li competed at the 2020 Summer Olympics in Tokyo, after China secured a quota as the 18th placed NOC at the 2019 World Championships. She finished 20th in the K1 event after being eliminated in the semifinal.

World Cup individual podiums

1 Asia Canoe Slalom Championship counting for World Cup points
2 Oceania Championship counting for World Cup points

References

External links 

 

1988 births
Living people
Chinese female canoeists
Sportspeople from Nantong
People from Rugao
Olympic canoeists of China
Canoeists at the 2020 Summer Olympics
Asian Games medalists in canoeing
Asian Games gold medalists for China
Asian Games silver medalists for China
Canoeists at the 2014 Asian Games
Canoeists at the 2018 Asian Games
Medalists at the 2014 Asian Games
Medalists at the 2018 Asian Games